Bishnupur, Nepal, may refer to one of two Nepalese villages:
Bishnupur, Bara
Bishnupur, Mahottari